The Robinson-Hiller House in Chapin, Lexington County, South Carolina, was built in 1902. It is significant as a Queen Anne house and for being associated with Charles Plumber Robinson (1867-1944), a businessman who founded C.P. Robinson Lumber Company and other enterprises, and his wife Sarah "Eddie" Smithson Robinson, a "social activist and officer of the Woman’s Christian Temperance Union." In 1919, after the Robinsons left Chapin, the house was acquired by James Haltiwanger Hiller.

It was listed on the U.S. National Register of Historic Places in 1998.  It is currently a commercial spa.

References

Houses on the National Register of Historic Places in South Carolina
Queen Anne architecture in South Carolina
Houses completed in 1902
Houses in Lexington County, South Carolina
National Register of Historic Places in Lexington County, South Carolina